Fuzzy cold dark matter is a hypothetical form of cold dark matter proposed to solve the cuspy halo problem. It would consist of extremely light scalar particles with masses on the order of  eV; so a Compton wavelength on the order of 1 light year. Fuzzy cold dark matter halos in dwarf galaxies would manifest wave behavior on astrophysical scales, and the cusps would be avoided through the Heisenberg uncertainty principle.
The wave behavior leads to interference patterns, spherical soliton cores in dark matter halo centers, and cylindrical soliton-like cores in dark matter cosmic web filaments.

Fuzzy cold dark matter is a limit of scalar field dark matter without self-interaction. It is governed by the Schrödinger–Poisson equation.

Notes 

Physical cosmology
Dark matter
Hypothetical objects